Torre Werfen ("Werfen Tower") (also named Torre Zenit, Torre Banif, and Torre Europa 2) is a skyscraper in L'Hospitalet de Llobregat (suburb of Barcelona), Catalonia, Spain. 

Completed in 2009, the building has 25 floors and rises 107 meters. 

The tower is on the Plaza de Europa 21. It is the head office of the Werfen Group, a medical equipment company.

See also

 List of tallest buildings and structures in Barcelona

References 

Skyscraper office buildings in Barcelona
Office buildings completed in 2009
Headquarters in Spain